Camilla Røseler Andersen (born 5 July 1973) is a former Danish team handball player, two times Olympic champion and a World champion. She received gold medals with the Danish national team at the 1996 Summer Olympics in Atlanta and at the 2000 Summer Olympics in Sydney. She is widely regarded as one of the best players Danish handball has ever seen.

In 2000, she entered a registered partnership with Norwegian handball player Mia Hundvin, but the couple split three years later. Sports Illustrated ran a lengthy feature on the two, who are much-discussed celebrities in their countries.

After retiring from sports, Camilla Andersen's civil career started as a student in the travel industry of the defunct company, Reisegalleriet. Later she started her travel agency Travel Sense specializing in sports trips.

In 2012, she was admitted to the National Olympic Committee and Sports Confederation of Denmark's Hall of Fame as the 27th member.

Achievements
Danish Championship:
Winner: 2003
Silver Medalist: 2004
Danish Cup:
Winner: 1997, 2002
Norwegian Championship:
Winner: 1997
EHF Champions League
Winner: 2004
EHF Cup:
Winner: 2003
EHF Cup Winners' Cup:
Winner: 1994

Individual awards
 All-Star Playmaker of European Championship: 1994, 1998
 All-Star Playmaker of World Championship: 1997
 Player of the Year in Denmark: 2003

References

1973 births
Living people
Danish female handball players
Olympic gold medalists for Denmark
Handball players at the 1996 Summer Olympics
Handball players at the 2000 Summer Olympics
Olympic medalists in handball
Danish LGBT sportspeople
LGBT handball players
Danish expatriate sportspeople in Norway
Danish expatriate sportspeople in Germany
Medalists at the 2000 Summer Olympics
Medalists at the 1996 Summer Olympics
21st-century Danish LGBT people